Cryptops spinipes is a species of centipede in the Cryptopidae family. It is native to Oceania and was first described in 1891 by British zoologist Reginald Innes Pocock.

Distribution
The species’ range includes eastern Australia, New Zealand, Fiji and the Solomon Islands.

Behaviour
The centipedes are solitary terrestrial predators that inhabit plant litter, soil and rotting wood.

References

 

 
spinipes
Centipedes of Australia
Fauna of New South Wales
Fauna of Queensland
Fauna of Fiji
Centipedes of New Zealand
Fauna of the Solomon Islands
Animals described in 1891
Taxa named by R. I. Pocock